Institut canadien may refer to:
Institut canadien de Montréal
Institut canadien de Québec